The Last Conflict is a 1988 Hong Kong action crime thriller television film produced by TVB directed by Raymond Lee and starring Donnie Yen, Adia Chan, Francis Ng, Stephen Chow, Lau Kong and Andy Tai.

Plot
Interpol officer Dickson Kwan is sent to Hong Kong to investigate in a fake passport forgery case and collaborates with officer Pau Sei and Lau Ting Kin. Due to different approaches on investigating, Dickson and Sei often get into conflicts. Later during an arrest operation, Dickson saves Sei's life and they forget about their bygones. Sei has a daughter Eva, who opposes his father being a cop. Dickson falls in love with Eva and pursues her, however she does not like Dickson's dangerous profession and although she has feelings for him, she still rejects him. On the day just after his retirement Sei is killed in an ambush by Tong who mistaken him for Dickson since he picked up the message Tong left for Dickson. Even without proof, Dickson knows the murderer of Sei is Tong and he relentlessly goes after him despite being ordered to leave Hong Kong. Finally Tong is shot dead by Lau Ting Kin at the construction site where he lured Dickson using Eva. Dickson finally leaves Hong Kong and the others go on with their lives in Hong Kong as usual.

Cast
 Donnie Yen as Dickson Kwan
 Stephen Chow as Lau Ting Kin
 Lau Kong as Sergeant Pau Sei
 Adia Chan as Eva Pau
 Francis Ng as Tong Hak
Andy Tai as Pow
Cheng Yim Fung
 Angela Yu Chien as Kin's mother
Sin Po Wah
Cheng Ka Sang as Man who takes hostage
Wong Chi Wai as thug
Liu Chun Hung as Lun
Lo Tin Wai
Stephen Yip as Ricky
Wong Sze Yan
Ng Sui Ting
Raymond Tsang
Chui Po Lun
Luk Chung Kit
Poon Man Pak
 Wayne Lai
Lily Liu
Wong Fung King
Lam Yin Ming
Ben Wong as Pork Shing
Kong Ning
Choi Ling
Ling Hon
Mak Ho Wai as Priest taken hostage
Wong Hung Kam
Sin Kim To
To Siu Chun
 Evergreen Mak
Shek Yan Wan
Chu Kong
Pau Wai Leung as receptionist
Tang Tai Wo
Lam Chi Tai
Mak Wai Cheung
Chung Wing
Fong Yue
Wong Ka Leung
Lam Foo wai
Fan Chin Hung

External links

The Last Conflict at Hong Kong Cinemagic

1988 television films
1988 films
1980s action thriller films
1980s crime thriller films
1988 martial arts films
Hong Kong action thriller films
Hong Kong crime thriller films
Hong Kong martial arts films
Kung fu films
Police detective films
1980s Cantonese-language films
Films set in Hong Kong
Films shot in Hong Kong
1980s Hong Kong films